Taringa Rovers is an Australian soccer club based at Indooroopilly, in the west of Brisbane, Australia. The club was founded in 1949 by Jack Speare and Ernie Dixon.

The club started with one junior team, playing out of Moore Park, Indooroopilly and moved to the Indooroopilly Recreation Reserve (now named Jack Speare Park) at Fairley Street Indooroopilly, in 1955.

Current squad

Youth

Players from the U23s who have been featured in a first-team matchday squad for Taringa in a competitive match

See also
History of association football (soccer) in Brisbane, Queensland

References

External links
 Official Website
 Supporters Website
 Uhlsport

Soccer clubs in Brisbane
Brisbane Premier League teams
Association football clubs established in 1949
1949 establishments in Australia